The list of ships of Algeria includes all ships designed, built, or operated in or by Algeria, in service with the Algerian National Navy.

Ship classes

Adhafer class corvette 

 In service:  3 ships: Adhafer (920); El Fatih (921); Ezzadjer (922)
 Displacement:  2880 tons
 Armament:  NG-16-1(76 mm) main gun, 2 Seven-barrel 30 mm Type 730 CIWS (Close-in weapon system), 2 Quad C-802 missiles
 China State Shipbuilding Corporation

Djebel Chenoua class large patrol boat 

 In service:  4 ships:  Djebel Chenoua (351); El Chihab (352); El Kirch (353); Hassan Barbiear (807)
 Displacement:  550 tons
 Armament:  2 dual 14.5 mm machineguns
 Larbi Ben M'Hidi Hyproc Shipping Company
 Didouche Mourad  -            -            -

El Idrissi coastal survey ship 

 Displacement:  540 tons
 Crew:  28

El Mourafik salvage ship 

 Displacement:  1000 tons
 Crew:  60
 Armament:  2 12.7 mm machineguns

Erradii class frigates 

 In service:  2 ships: ; 
 Displacement: 3400 tons
 Armament:  127 mm main gun, RBS-15 SSM missiles

Kalaat Beni Hammed class small landing ship 

 In service:  2 ships
 Displacement:  2130 tons
 Crew:  81
 Aircraft:  Helicopter deck only
 Capacity:  240 troops; 650 tons of cargo
 Armament:  Dual 40 mm AA gun; 2 25 mm AA guns

Kebir (P4) class patrol boat 

 In service:  8-10 ships plus 2-3 building
 Displacement:  250 tons
 Crew:  27
 Armament:  Dual 25 mm AA guns; 2 14.5 mm machineguns
 Note:  Initial two ships carried a 76 mm OTO DP gun in place of the 25 mm guns.

Rajs Hadi Mubarek (Project 887EKM Kilo) class diesel-electric submarine 

 In service:  2 ships: 012 , 013 
 Displacement:  3076 tons
 Crew: 53
 Equipment:  LF and HF sonar
 Armament:  6  torpedo tubes with 18 torpedoes, Club-S missiles.

Rais Hadi Slimane (Project 636M Improved Kilo) class diesel-electric submarine 

 In service:  4 ships: 021 , 022  and two with unknown name (shipyard numerals 01346 and 01347).
 Displacement:  3126 tons
 Crew:  53
 Equipment:  LF and HF sonar
 Armament:  6  torpedo tubes with 18 torpedoes, Club-S missiles.

Koni class light frigate 

 In service:  3 ships:  Mourad Rais (901); Rais Kellik (902); Rais Korfu (903)
 Displacement:  1596 tons
 Crew:  130
 Equipment:  Strut Curve air and surface search radar, MF hull sonar, Pop Group missile control, Hawk Screech gun control, Drum Tilt gun control, Watch Dog intercept
 Armament:  SA-N-4 Gecko SAM system with 20 missiles, 2 dual 76.2 mm DP guns, 2 dual 30 mm AA guns, 2 RBU-6000 anti-submarine rocket systems, 2 depth-charge racks, mines
 Note:  Recent overhaul by Russia has added new search radar, an additional Drum Tilt, and 2 dual  torpedo tubes to at least one ship, probably planned for installation on all ships.

Nanuchka II class corvette 

 In service:  3 ships:  Rais Hamidou (801); Salah Rais (802); Rais Ali (803)
 Displacement:  675 tons
 Crew:  60
 Equipment:  Square Tie surface search radar, Pop Group missile fire control, Muff Cob gun fire control, Bell Tap intercept, Cross Loop direction finder, chaff
 Armament:  4 SS-N-2C Styx SSM; SA-N-4 Gecko SAM system with 20 missiles; dual 57 mm DP gun
 Note:  Recent upgrade has added new search radar, replaced the Styx missiles with 16 SS-N-25 Kh-35 SSM and the 57 mm guns with a single 30 mm AA gun.

Osa I class missile boat 

 In service:  2 ships
 Displacement:  209 tons
 Crew:  30
 Equipment:  Square Tie surface search radar, Drum Tilt gun fire control
 Armament:  4 SS-N-2A Styx SSM; 2 dual 30 mm AA guns

Osa II class missile boat 

 In service:  9 ships
 Displacement:  240 tons
 Crew:  30
 Equipment:  Square Tie surface search radar, Drum Tilt gun fire control
 Armament:  4 SS-N-2B Styx SSM; 2 dual 30 mm AA guns

Polnocny B class utility landing craft 

 In service:  1 ship
 Displacement:  800 tons
 Crew:  40
 Capacity:  130 troops; 180 tons cargo
 Armament:  Dual 30 mm AA guns

Individual ships

D 

 Djebel Chenoua (351):  Djebel Chenoua class patrol boat in active service, commissioned 1988.

E 

 El Chihab (352):  Djebel Chenoua class patrol boat in active service, commissioned 1995.
 El Djari (346):  Kebir class patrol boat in active service, commissioned 1986.
 El Hadi Slimane (O13):  Kilo class submarine in active service, commissioned 1988.
 El Idrissi (BH204):  Japanese built coastal survey ship in active service, commissioned 1980.
 El Kechef (343):  Kebir class patrol boat in active service, commissioned 1984.
 El Mellah (938):  three mast training tall ship constructed in Gdańsk, Poland, commissioned 2017.
 El Morakeb (342):  Kebir class patrol boat in active service, commissioned 1983.
 El Moudamir (911): El Radii class frigate in active service, commissioned 2017.
 El Moukadem (348):  Kebir class patrol boat in active service.
 El Mourafik (261):  Chinese built small salvage ship in active service, commissioned 1990.
 El Moutarid (344):  Kebir class patrol boat in active service, commissioned 1985.
 El Radii (910): El Radii class frigate in active service, commissioned 2016.
 El Rassed (345):  Kebir class patrol boat in active service, commissioned 1985.
 El Saher (347):  Kebir class patrol boat in active service.
 El Wafi (355):  Kebir class patrol boat in active service.
 El Yadekh (341):  Kebir class patrol boat in active service, commissioned 1982.

K 

 Kalaat Beni Abbès (474): Italian built amphibious transport dock in active service, commissioned 2014. Armed with Aster missiles
 Kalaat Beni Hammed (472):  United Kingdom (Brooke Marine) built landing ship (BDSL) in active service, commissioned 1984.
 Kalaat Beni Rached (473):  United Kingdom (Brooke Marine / Vosper Thornycroft) built landing ship (BDSL) in active service, commissioned 1984.

M 

 Mourad Rais (901):  Koni class frigate in active service, commissioned 1980.

R 

 Rais Ali (803):  Nanuchka II class corvette in active service, commissioned 1982.
 Rais Hamidou (801):  Nanuchka II class corvette in active service, commissioned 1980.
 Rais Kellik (902):  Koni class frigate in active service, commissioned 1982.
 Rais Korfu (903):  Koni class frigate in active service, commissioned 1984.
 Rajs Hadi Mubarek (O12):  Kilo class submarine in active service, commissioned 1987.

S 

 Salah Rais (802):  Nanuchka II class corvette in active service, commissioned 1981.

Numbered vessels 

 Romeo-class submarine S-10: Soviet built and transferred in 1982. Decommissioned in 1989.
 Romeo-class submarine S-11: Soviet built and transferred in 1983. Decommissioned in 1989.
 471:  Polish built Polnocny B class utility landing craft in active service, commissioned 1976.
 641:  Osa I class missile boat in active service, commissioned 1967.
 642:  Osa I class missile boat in active service, commissioned 1967.
 644:  Osa II class missile boat in active service, commissioned 1976.
 645:  Osa II class missile boat in active service, commissioned 1976.
 646:  Osa II class missile boat in active service, commissioned 1977.
 647:  Osa II class missile boat in active service, commissioned 1977.
 648:  Osa II class missile boat in active service, commissioned 1978.
 649:  Osa II class missile boat in active service, commissioned 1978.
 650:  Osa II class missile boat in active service, commissioned 1979.
 651:  Osa II class missile boat in active service, commissioned 1979.
 652:  Osa II class missile boat in active service, commissioned 1980.

References

Algeria
Ships of Algeria
Ships
Ships